Volkmann's contracture is a permanent flexion contracture of the hand at the wrist, resulting in a claw-like deformity of the hand and fingers. Passive extension of fingers is restricted and painful.

Signs and symptoms

Causes
Any fracture in the elbow region or upper arm may lead to Volkmann's ischemic contracture, but it is especially associated with supracondylar fracture of the humerus. It is also caused by fractures of the forearm bones if they cause bleeding from the major blood vessels of the forearm.

The condition may be caused by obstruction on the brachial artery near the elbow, possibly from improper use of a tourniquet, improper use of a plaster cast, or compartment syndrome.

Pathophysiology 
Volkmann's contracture results from acute ischaemia and necrosis of the muscle fibres of the flexor group of muscles of the forearm, especially the flexor digitorum profundus and flexor pollicis longus. The muscles become fibrotic and shortened.

Diagnosis

Prevention
Prevention of the condition requires restoration of blood flow after injury and reduction of compartmental pressure on the muscles. Any splints, bandages, or other devices that might be obstructing circulation must be removed.

A fasciotomy may be required to reduce pressure in the muscle compartment.

Treatment 
If contracture occurs, surgery to release the fixed tissues may help with the deformity and function of the hand.

History
It is named after Richard von Volkmann (1830–1889), the 19th century German doctor who first described it, in a paper on "non-Infective Ischemic conditions of various fascial compartments in the extremities". Because the contracture occurred at the same time as the paralysis, he considered a nerve cause to be unlikely.

References

External links 

Early complications of trauma
Orthopedic problems